Death Before Dishonor XVII was a two-night professional wrestling event produced by American promotion Ring of Honor (ROH), which took place Friday, September 27 and Saturday September 28, 2019, at the Sam's Town Hotel and Gambling Hall in the Las Vegas suburb of Sunrise Manor, Nevada. Friday's show was a pay-per-view broadcast, while Saturday's was a set of tapings for ROH's flagship program Ring of Honor Wrestling.

Storylines
This professional wrestling event featured professional wrestling matches, which involve different wrestlers from pre-existing scripted feuds, plots, and storylines that play out on ROH's television programs. Wrestlers portray villains or heroes as they follow a series of events that build tension and culminate in a wrestling match or series of matches.

Matches

Night 1

Night 2 (TV tapings)

See also
2019 in professional wrestling

References

External links

2019 in professional wrestling
2019 in Nevada
Events in Sunrise Manor, Nevada
Professional wrestling shows in the Las Vegas Valley
ROH Death Before Dishonor
September 2019 events in the United States